The  are a mountain range running along the southern border of Kagawa and the northern border of Tokushima prefectures on the island of Shikoku, Japan.

Parts of the mountains are included within the Ōtaki-Ōkawa Prefectural Natural Park.

References

External links
 (Mt.Ryūō)

Mountain ranges of Kagawa Prefecture
Mountain ranges of Tokushima Prefecture